Wikipedia includes several lists of watercraft types. Note that "type" may refer to the physical characteristics or the intended purpose of the vessel. This is distinct from a "class", where all the vessels share the same design.
 List of boat types
 List of Philippine boats and ships
 List of the types of canal craft in the United Kingdom
 List of sailing boat types
 List of types of naval vessels
 List of ship types

See also
 List of naval ship classes in service
 List of submarine classes in service
 List of auxiliary ship classes in service